Oyewusi Ibidapo-Obe (5 July 1949 – 3 January 2021) was a Nigerian professor of Systems Engineering educational administrator and vice chancellor of the University of Lagos. He died from COVID-19 complications on 3 January 2021, during the COVID-19 pandemic in Nigeria.

Education
He attended Lagos Street African Church Primary School, Ebute-Metta (1955–1961) and Obokun High School/Ilesa Grammar School (1962–1966) and later attended Igbobi College, Yaba, (1966–1968) Lagos state, Nigeria for his secondary education.

He received a bachelor's degree in Mathematics from the University of Lagos.
He obtained a Master in Mathematics (M.Maths) degree in Applied Mathematics with a minor in Computer Science in the year 1973 and further with a Doctor of Philosophy (PhD) in Civil Engineering specializing in Applied Mechanics/System in 1976 from the University of Waterloo Canada.https://www.vanguardngr.com/2021/01/former-unilag-vc-prof-ibidapo-obe-is-dead/https:

Life and career
Ibidapo Obe was born on 5 July 1949, at Ile Ife, Osun State Nigeria. He served as a Visiting Research Associate Professor in the Department of Civil Engineering at the State University of New York at Buffalo, US (1980–1981).
In 2007, he was a Visiting Research Professor at Texas Southern University in Houston, USA.
He was appointed as the Vice chancellor of the University of Lagos in year 2000, succeeding Jelili Adebisi Omotola. He was later succeeded by Tolu Olukayode Odugbemi in 2007 after his successful tenure.
He was married to Sola Ibidapo-Obe.https://thenationonlineng.net/ibidapo-obe-didnt-die-of-covid-19-says-family/

Awards and honours
University of Waterloo Post Doctoral Distinction Award Fellow (1976). He was a fellow of the Natural Sciences and Engineering Research Council, Canada (1977–1979) 
Fellowship of the Academy of Science and Engineering.

 In 2004 he was conferred the national honor as the Officer of the Federal Republic (OFR) by the Federal Republic of Nigeria.https://thenationonlineng.net/10-things-to-know-about-ex-unilag-vc-late-prof-ibidapo-obe/

 He was a two time Award recipient of the Best Vice Chancellor Prize (2004,2005) for the Nigerian University System (NUS).https://thenationonlineng.net/10-things-to-know-about-ex-unilag-vc-late-prof-ibidapo-obe

 In 2010 he was elected Fellow of the African Academy of Science (AAS), As well as that of The World Academy of Science (TWAS).https://thenationonlineng.net/10-things-to-know-about-ex-unilag-vc-late-prof-ibidapo-obe/

Membership of professional bodies
Fellow of the Africa Academy of Science
Fellow of the Academy of Sciences for the Developing World (TWAS)

See also
List of vice chancellors in Nigeria
Jelili Adebisi Omotola
University of Lagos

References

1949 births
2021 deaths
Nigerian educational theorists
People from Ilesha
University of Lagos alumni
University of Waterloo alumni
State University of New York faculty
Academic staff of the University of Lagos
Texas Southern University faculty
20th-century Nigerian mathematicians
Igbobi College alumni
Fellows of the Nigerian Academy of Science
Vice-Chancellors of the University of Lagos
Nigerian expatriate academics in the United States
Deaths from the COVID-19 pandemic in Nigeria
Fellows of the African Academy of Sciences